Formula E is a single seater motorsport championship that uses only electric cars. The series is promoted and owned by Formula E Holdings and administered by the global governing body of motorsport, the Fédération Internationale de l'Automobile (FIA), since its inception in 2014. The Formula E season consists of a series of races. known as ePrixs, held usually in city centres, and in a few cases on permanent racing circuits.  Points are awarded based on individual race results as well as for earning pole position in qualifying, setting the fastest lap in the group stage, and fastest lap during the race, with the highest tally of points winning the respective championship or trophy. The two main awards in the series are the Drivers' Championship and the Teams' Championship. A driver and team secures the Championship each season when it is no longer mathematically possible for another driver and team to beat them no matter the outcome of the remaining races, although it is not officially awarded until the FIA Prize Giving Ceremony that is held after the season has ended. 

 out of the seventy-seven drivers who started a ePrix, there have been seven Formula E Drivers' Championships. The first Formula E Drivers' Champion was Nelson Piquet in the 2014–15 season and the current title holder is Stoffel Vandoorne in the 2021–22 season. Jean-Éric Vergne holds the record for the most Drivers' Championships, having achieved the title on two occasions, while the other six Drivers' Champions have won the title just once. It has been won by drivers from Brazil twice between two drivers, followed by France with two championships from a single driver. The Drivers' Championship has been claimed in the final race of the season six times in the eight seasons it has been awarded. Out of the 15 teams that have entered a ePrix, four have won the Teams' Championship. Renault e.Dams holds the record for the highest number of Teams' Championship victories, having won the title on three occasions. German teams have won the title three times between two teams and French squads have earned the accolade three times between one team.

Drivers

Championship

By country

By powertrain manufacturer

Teams

Championship

By racing license

By powertrain manufacturer

Voestalpine European Races Trophy

Bibliography

References

External links
 

Formula E
Formula E
Formula E
Formula E